Princess Pyeonggang (died 595) was a Goguryeo Princess as the daughter of King Pyeongwon and sister of King Yeongyang She was married to General On Dal.

In popular culture
 Portrayed by Nam Sang-mi in the 2009 KBS2 TV series Invincible Lee Pyung Kang.
 Portrayed by Jin Ye-ju in the 2017 Netflix TV series My Only Love Song.
 Portrayed by Kim So-hyun, Heo Jung-eun, and Jung Yoon-ha in the 2021 KBS2 TV series River Where The Moon Rises.

References

External links
Princess Pyeonggang on Encykorea .
Princess Pyeonggang on Doosan Encyclopedia .

Date of birth unknown
6th-century Korean women
Korean princesses
Place of birth unknown
Place of death unknown
Year of birth unknown
Year of death unknown
Date of death unknown